The 1983 Pittsburgh Steelers season was the franchise's 51st season in the National Football League.

Personnel

Staff

Roster

Preseason

Schedule

Regular season

Schedule

Week 1: vs. Denver Broncos

Week 2: at Green Bay Packers

Week 3: at Houston Oilers

Week 4: vs. New England Patriots

Week 5: vs. Houston Oilers

Week 6: at Cincinnati Bengals

Week 7: vs. Cleveland Browns

Week 8: at Seattle Seahawks

Week 9: vs. Tampa Bay Buccaneers

Week 10: vs. San Diego Chargers

Week 11: at Baltimore Colts

The Colts' first sellout since 1977, and last in Baltimore, came about because thousands of Steelers fans who normally could not purchase tickets at Three Rivers Stadium found them cheap and plentiful in Maryland. Pittsburgh returned to Memorial Stadium with the birth of the Baltimore Ravens in 1996.

Week 12: vs. Minnesota Vikings

Week 13: at Detroit Lions

Pittsburgh's first trip to the Motor City since 1967 was nothing short of disastrous. It was the Steelers' most lopsided loss under Noll, eclipsed only by a 51-0 embarrassment by the Browns at home in the 1989 opener.

Week 14: vs. Cincinnati Bengals

Week 15: at New York Jets

After having been sidelined with an elbow injury for the first 14 games of the season, 36-year old Terry Bradshaw started his first game of the season. Despite still clearly being hampered by his elbow, he was able to impress in limited time. It would the final time Bradshaw would see the field as a player, as he felt a pop in his elbow while throwing his final pass, a 10-yard touchdown to Calvin Sweeney. Bradshaw did not play during the play-offs and retired after the season.

Week 16: at Cleveland Browns

Eight days after Bradshaw threw his last pass, Brian Sipe started his last NFL game in what turned out to be a hollow victory for the Browns, who were eliminated from the playoffs three hours later when the Seahawks defeated the Patriots in Seattle.

Standings

Playoffs

AFC Divisional Playoff: at Los Angeles Raiders

References

External links
 1983 Pittsburgh Steelers season at Profootballreference.com 
 1983 Pittsburgh Steelers season statistics at jt-sw.com 

Pittsburgh Steelers seasons
Pittsburgh Steelers
AFC Central championship seasons
Pittsburgh Steelers season